Bains is an unincorporated community in West Feliciana Parish, Louisiana, United States. Its elevation is 187 feet (57 m).

History
Bains was named for Dr. Henry Bains, a plantation owner.

Education

Residents are zoned to West Feliciana Parish Public Schools. Elementary school children attend Bains Lower Elementary School and Bains Elementary School in Bains. Secondary schools serving Bains are West Feliciana Middle School and West Feliciana High School in Bains.

The West Feliciana Parish Library is located in St. Francisville. The library, previously a part of the Audubon Regional Library System, became independent in January 2004.

West Feliciana Parish is in the service area of Baton Rouge Community College.

References

Unincorporated communities in West Feliciana Parish, Louisiana
Unincorporated communities in Louisiana